Mark L. Van Name (born 14 March 1955) is an American science fiction writer and technology consultant.  As of 2009, Van Name lives in North Carolina.

About
With John Kessel, Van Name co-founded the Sycamore Hill Writer's Workshop in 1985, and in 1996 he, Kessel, and Richard Butner edited an anthology of stories written there, called Intersections: The Sycamore Hill Anthology, including one of his own stories.

Van Name's first professionally published science fiction short story  was "My Sister, My Self", in 1984, in the anthology Isaac Asimov's Tomorrow's Voices. His first novel, One Jump Ahead, was published by Baen Books in 2007, and won the Compton Crook Award for Best First Novel in the Science Fiction, Fantasy and Horror genres in 2008. It is the first book in the Jon and Lobo series, of which he published another four books until 2012.

In 2009, he premiered a stand-up comedy routine at Balticon, the Baltimore Science Fiction Convention.

Van Name has worked in the information technology field for over 30 years, at one time serving as Vice President of Product Testing for Ziff-Davis, and has written many technical articles for print and on-line publications including Computer Shopper and PC Week. He currently is CEO of a technology assessment company, Principled Technologies, in the Research Triangle area of North Carolina.

Bibliography

Novels
Jon and Lobo Series
 One Jump Ahead (June 2007) 
 Slanted Jack (July 2008) 
 Overthrowing Heaven (June 2009) 
 Children No More (August 2010) 
 No Going Back (May 2012) 

 Jump Gate Twist (July 2010) , a trade paperback omnibus re-issue of the novels One Jump Ahead and Slanted Jack accompanied by 4 essays and the short stories My Sister, My Self and Lobo, Actually

Short stories

"My Sister, My Self in Isaac Asimov’s Tomorrow’s Voices ed. Editors of Isaac Asimov’s (Dial 0-385-27998-1, Apr ’84
"Happy Birthday" with Jack McDevitt in The Further Adventures of the Joker ed. Martin H. Greenberg (Bantam 0-553-28531-9, Mar ’90
"TV Time" in Isaac Asimov’s Science Fiction Magazine [v15 # 4 & 5, No.169 & 170, April 1991] ed. Gardner R. Dozois
"Burning Up" in When the Music’s Over ed. Lewis Shiner (Bantam Spectra 0-553-28985-3, May ’91
"The Ten Thousand Things" in Jim Baen's Universe Vol.1, No.6. Also in The Best of Jim Baen's Universe II.
"Desert Rain" with Pat Murphy in Full Spectrum 3, ed. Lou Aronica, Amy Stout & Betsy Mitchell, Doubleday Foundation, 1991
"Broken Bits" in Future Weapons of War, Joe Haldeman and Martin H. Greenberg, Editors
"Missing Connections" in Intersections: The Sycamore Hill Anthology ed. John Kessel, Mark L. Van Name & Richard Butner (Tor 0-312-86090-0, Jan ’96)
"Basic Training" in Armageddon ed. David Drake, Billie Sue Mosiman & Martin H. Greenberg (Baen 0-671-87876-X, May ’98)

Anthologies
 Transhuman (2008) (with T K F Weisskopf)
 The Wild Side (2011)

Non fictionWindows Performance Secrets (1998) (with Richard Butner)2001: The Personal Computer Article in New Destinies'', Vol. IX/Fall 1990 ed. Jim Baen (Baen 0-671-2016-3, Sep ’90

References

External links
http://www.markvanname.com/
https://web.archive.org/web/20100102034004/http://baen.com/Interviews/vintMLVanName.htm

21st-century American novelists
American male novelists
American science fiction writers
American technology writers
Living people
1955 births
American male short story writers
21st-century American short story writers
21st-century American male writers
21st-century American non-fiction writers
American male non-fiction writers